King of Cadonia is an English musical in two acts with a book by Frederick Lonsdale, lyrics by Adrian Ross and Arthur Wimperis and music by Sidney Jones and Frederick Rosse. It opened at the Prince of Wales Theatre in London on 3 September 1908, produced by Frank Curzon, and ran for 333 performances. It starred Isabel Jay, Huntley Wright, and Bertram Wallis. There was a brief Broadway production in 1910 with additional music by Jerome Kern at the Fifth Avenue Theatre and directed by Joseph W. Herbert.

This was Lonsdale's first success.  Famous songs included "The Wind of Love", "The Portrait" and "Disguises".

Synopsis
Act 1 – The Gardens of the Duke of Alasia

In Cadonia, a mythical country where the king is frequently replaced, the soon-to-be crowned sovereign, Alexis, is tired of the limitations that are placed on his freedom.  He learns that there is a conspiracy afoot to assassinate him, and therefore he shaves off his moustache and beard to escape. The disguise is successful.  He soon meets Princess Marie, the daughter of the Duke of Alasia, heir presumptive to the Cadonian throne. The princess falls in love with the handsome stranger, and she is pleased to learn that the king has mysteriously disappeared. But her feelings of relief are not shared by her father, the duke, who dreads above all things being called upon to rule over such an unstable country as Cadonia.

Act 2 – The Palace of the King of Cadonia

Alexis, still disguised, infiltrates the murderous conspirators, the chief of whom is posing as head gardener to the duke.  He wins the favourable opinion of the conspirators, so that when his true identity is finally revealed, they acknowledge that, at last, Cadonia has been fortunate enough to secure a monarch who may be trusted to rule his people discreetly and bravely. The princess is equally pleased to find that love and duty will now go hand-in-hand and the timid duke is no less delighted at the prospect of avoiding the throne.

Roles and original cast
The Duke of Alasia, Heir presumptive to the throne – Huntley Wright
Princess Marie, his daughter – Isabel Jay
Alexis, King of Cadonia – Bertram Wallis
General Bonski – Robert Cunningham
Captain Laski – Pope Stamper
Lieutenant Jules – Harold Deacon
Lieutenant Saloff – Cameron Carr
Panix, Secretary to the Duke of Alasia – Arthur Laceby
Laborde, Head gardener to the Duke of Alasia – Akerman May
Bran, Servant to Captain Laski – George Barrett
Militza, Maid to Princess Marie – Gracie Leigh
Stephanie, First Lady in Waiting to Princess Marie – Peggy Bethel
Duchess of Alasia – Amy Martin
Ladies in Waiting: Natine, Wadna, Ottaline and Fridoline – Queenie Merrall, Gladys Beech, Claire Lynch and Gladys Anderson
Chorus of soldiers, gardeners, peasants, ladies of the Court, etc.

Musical numbers

Act I
As Happy As A King – Laski
Not A Little Bit Like You – Militza
The Man I Marry – Marie
Reasons of State – Marie, Duchess, Duke, Panix
Hail! The King – Chorus
Overrated – Alexis
The Barber – Laski & Chorus of Guards
The Lady Of the Castle In the Air – Marie and Alexis
Do Not Hesitate To Shoot – Duke
The Portrait – Marie, Alexis and Girls

Act II
In the Swim – Militza
The Wind of Love – Marie
There's A King In the Land Today – Alexis
Situations – Militza
Things That I Know I Could Do – Duke
The Woman and the Man – Marie and Alexis
Change Partners – Stephanie and Laski
Disguises – Militza and Duke
Love and Duty – Marie and Alexis

External links

Synopsis, list of roles and list of musical numbers
Midi files, lyrics and London cast list
Information about the Broadway production

1908 musicals
British musicals
Fictional dukes and duchesses
Fictional kings
Musicals by Frederick Lonsdale
Musicals by Sidney Jones
Original musicals
West End musicals